Paul Adrian Todd (born 12 March 1953) is a former English cricketer. Todd was a right-handed batsman who bowled right-arm medium pace. He was born at Morton, Nottinghamshire.

References

External links
Paul Todd at ESPNcricinfo
Paul Todd at CricketArchive

1953 births
Living people
People from Newark and Sherwood (district)
Cricketers from Nottinghamshire
English cricketers
Nottinghamshire cricketers
Lincolnshire cricketers
Minor Counties cricketers
Glamorgan cricketers